Viva (also Romanized as Vīvā and Veyvā; also known as Vevā) is a village in Tuskacheshmeh Rural District, in the Central District of Galugah County, Mazandaran Province, Iran. At the 2006 census, its population was 81, in 19 families.

References 

Populated places in Galugah County